Carrington Municipal Airport  is a public airport located one mile (1.6 km) west of the central business district of Carrington, in Foster County, North Dakota, United States. It is owned by the Carrington Airport Authority.  Originally constructed in 1931, it was named Matheny Field in honor of retired Air Force Brig. Gen. William A. Matheny, a native of Carrington, until its expansion to two runways in 1969.

Facilities and aircraft

For the 12-month period ending July 31, 2007, the airport had 2,410 aircraft operations: 87% general aviation, 12% air taxi, and less than 1% military.

References

External links

Airports in North Dakota
Buildings and structures in Foster County, North Dakota
Transportation in Foster County, North Dakota